Lac-Malakisis Ecological Reserve is an ecological reserve in Quebec, Canada. It was established in 1978 but underwent change in 2003. Lac-Malakisis Ecological Reserve is northwest of Lac du Marais.

References

External links
 Official website from Government of Québec

Protected areas of Abitibi-Témiscamingue
Nature reserves in Quebec
Protected areas established in 1978
1978 establishments in Quebec